is a series of turn-based strategy video games developed by OmiyaSoft. It revolves around virtual board game-like gameplay in which the player traverses a map and uses magical, tablet-like "cards" to defeat their opponents by forcing them to land on specific spaces and pay a toll, similar to Monopoly. The player gains cards in the manner of a collectible card game. In the game's lore, people who are able to manipulate these cards, fragments of Culdcept, an eponymous all-powerful book of creation, are known as Cepters. The first game in the series, Culdcept, was released in 1997 on the Sega Saturn.

Games

Culdcept 

Culdcept's initial release was Japan-only on the Sega Saturn in 1997, and later, an upgraded port, Culdcept Expansion, was released on the PlayStation in 1999. This saw a re-release as Culdcept Expansion Plus in 2000. It was again ported to the Nintendo DS in 2008 as Culdcept DS.

Culdcept Second 

Culdcept Second, the sequel to Culdcept, saw a Japan-only release on the Dreamcast in 2001, and an expansion, Culdcept Second Expansion, was released for the PlayStation 2 in 2002. The expansion was marketed in North America as Culdcept, and published by NEC Interchannel on December 4, 2003.

Culdcept Saga 

Culdcept Saga was released for Xbox 360 in Japan in 2006, and North America in 2008, but never saw a PAL release. It is the first entry for a Microsoft console in the franchise.

Culdcept DS 
Culdcept DS is a port of Culdcept, released on the Nintendo DS in 2008 and published by Sega.

Culdcept (Nintendo 3DS)
Culdcept for the Nintendo 3DS saw a Japan-only release on June 28, 2012. Its game balance is based on that of Culdcept Second. The game became known for an advertising campaign featuring a businesslike female character named , played by actress Aya Shibata, who explained the game's rules and characters, but was seen as an unusual Nintendo "sex symbol" due to her erotic-sounding voice.

Culdcept Revolt 

Culdcept Revolt was released on Nintendo 3DS in Japan in 2016, and in North America, Europe and Australia in 2017. It is a sequel to Culdcept.

Other media 
A series of manga books were released based on the original Culdcept. The manga is about an apprentice Cepter named Najaran (with her worrywart talking staff, Goligan) who helps save the Culdcept, the book which the goddess Culdra had kept all the cards in until the War of the Gods. The manga was adapted by Shinya Kaneko and serialized in Japan by Kodansha in Magazine Z, and collected in six bound volumes. It is licensed in English by Tokyopop.

Common elements

Plot and themes 
All Culdcept games take place in a shared fictional universe known as Culdra Space. It was initially created by the omnipotent goddess Culdra, with its first world being similar to Earth. She also created Culdcept, a book with the power of creation. However, one of her servants, the god Baltias, rebelled against her and tried to steal Culdcept, prompting the War of the Gods. As punishment, Culdra destroyed Culdcept, and its pages became cards. When the people of the world discovered the cards, the Cepters who could manipulate them began to fight for supremacy. When the strongest Cepter defeated Baltias, they gained the power of a god and the ability to create their own world.

The subsequent Culdcept games each take place in their own world, which was created by a champion of a former world, who rules over it as its god or goddess. This has caused exponential growth and a nigh-infinite amount of worlds to be created.

A recurring character is Goligan, a talking cane with the head of a man who serves as Culdra's messenger in seeking out Cepters to fulfill their destinies.

Gameplay 
The gameplay of the Culdcept series is often described as a hybrid of Magic: The Gathering and Monopoly, in which players take turns traversing a game board filled with squares of varying elements or effects. Players first construct a deck of 50 monster, item or spell cards. When in the game itself, players roll a dice at the start of each turn, which determines how many spaces they can move. Landing on an unoccupied space allows the player to take control of it with a monster and grants them magical power. They can later spend power upgrading these lands, which further increases their total magic.

If a player lands on an occupied space, they can battle the foe there, and if they succeed, they will take control from the enemy. Or, they can choose to pay a toll without fighting the enemy. If the battle is lost, the toll must be paid regardless. Players earn points towards new card packs when playing in Story Mode, but the games also have a player versus player element in which multiple people can battle.

Soundtrack 
While the original Culdcept was composed by Takeshi Yanagawa and Yuzo Koshiro, Kenji Ito became the primary or sole composer for many of the Culdcept games, starting with Culdcept Second and continuing on to the series' most recent entry, Culdcept Revolt. He regards the soundtrack of Culdcept Second, the first he composed after leaving Square, as his "best work".

Reception 
Overall, the series was praised for its deep strategic elements and unique gameplay, but received criticism for its high learning curve and level of difficulty, as well as its luck-based elements, leading to it being called a "niche" series. Mike Fahey of Kotaku called the gameplay's emphasis on luck "frustrating and humiliating, but also kind of exhilarating".

References 

 
Video game franchises introduced in 1997
Turn-based strategy video games by series
Digital collectible card games